Orchard is a free, open source, community-focused content management system written in ASP.NET platform using the ASP.NET MVC framework. Its vision is to create shared components for building ASP.NET applications and extensions, and specific applications that leverage these components to meet the needs of end-users, scripters, and developers. 

Orchard is delivered as part of the ASP.NET Open Source Gallery under the .NET Foundation. It is licensed under a New BSD license, which is approved by the Open Source Initiative (OSI). The predecessor of Orchard was Microsoft Oxite.

Project status
Orchard is currently in active community-driven development. The project includes an extensibility model for both modules and themes, a dynamic content type system, ease of customization, localization and more.

Although several of primary developers work for Microsoft, it is no longer an officially developed Microsoft product, and is under the auspices of the .NET Foundation.

The project is managed by the Orchard Steering Committee, based on a published governance model. Steering Committee members are elected by the community annually.

References

External links

 Orchard Themes and Modules Gallery
 Orchard: Microsoft's open-source CMS platform is (re)born
 Why You Should Pay Attention to the Development of Orchard CMS
 Boston Orchard CMS User Group

Blog software
Content management systems
Free content management systems
Web frameworks
2011 software